Lead(II) iodide (or lead iodide) is a chemical compound with the formula .  At room temperature, it is a bright yellow odorless crystalline solid, that becomes orange and red when heated.  It was formerly called plumbous iodide.

The compound currently has a few specialized applications, such as the manufacture of solar cells and X-ray and gamma-ray detectors. Its preparation is an entertaining and popular demonstration in chemistry education, to teach topics such as precipitation reactions and stoichiometry. It is decomposed by light at temperatures above , and this effect has been used in a patented photographic process.

Lead iodide was formerly employed as a yellow pigment in some paints, with the name iodide yellow. However, that use has been largely discontinued due to its toxicity and poor stability.

Preparation

 is commonly synthesized via a precipitation reaction between potassium iodide  and lead(II) nitrate2 in water solution:

Pb(NO3)2 + 2 KI → PbI2 + 2 KNO3

While the potassium nitrate  is soluble, the lead iodide  is nearly insoluble at room temperature, and thus precipitates out.

Other soluble compounds containing lead(II) and iodide can be used instead, for example lead(II) acetate and sodium iodide.

The compound can also be synthesized by reacting iodine vapor with molten lead between 500 and 700 °C.

A thin film of  can also be prepared by depositing a film of lead sulfide  and exposing it to iodine vapor, by the reaction

PbS + I2 → PbI2 + S

The sulfur is then washed with dimethyl sulfoxide.

Crystallization

Lead iodide prepared from cold solutions usually consists of many small hexagonal platelets, giving the yellow precipitate a silky appearance. Larger crystals can be obtained by exploiting the fact that solubility of lead iodide in water (like those of lead chloride and lead bromide) increases dramatically with temperature. The compound is colorless when dissolved in hot water, but crystallizes on cooling as thin but visibly larger bright yellow flakes, that settle slowly through the liquid — a visual effect often described as "golden rain".

Even larger crystals can be obtained by slowing down the common reaction. A simple setup is to submerge two beakers containing the concentrated reactants in a larger container of water, taking care to avoid currents.  As the two substances diffuse through the water and meet, they slowly react and deposit the iodide in the space between the beakers.

Another similar method is to react the two substances in a gel medium, that slows down the diffusion and supports the growing crystal away from the container's walls. Patel and Rao have used this method to grow crystals up to 30 mm in diameter and 2 mm thick.

The reaction can be slowed also by separating the two reagents with a permeable membrane. This approach, with a cellulose membrane, was used in September 1988 to study the growth of  crystals in zero gravity, in an experiment flown on the Space Shuttle Discovery.

 can also be crystallized from powder by sublimation at 390 °C, in near vacuum or in a current of argon with some hydrogen.

Large high-purity crystals can be obtained by zone melting or by the Bridgman–Stockbarger technique. These processes can remove various impurities from commercial .

Applications

Lead iodide is a precursor material in the fabrication of highly efficient solar cells. The layer is then treated with a solution of methylammonium iodide  and annealed, turning it into the double salt methylammonium lead iodide , with a perovskite structure. The reaction changes the film's color from yellow to light brown.

 is also used as a high-energy photon detector for gamma-rays and X-rays, due to its wide band gap which ensures low noise operation.

Lead iodide was formerly used as a paint pigment under the name "iodine yellow".  It was described by Prosper Mérimée (1830) as "not yet much known in commerce, is as bright as orpiment or chromate of lead. It is thought to be more permanent; but time only can prove its pretension to so essential a quality. It is prepared by precipitating a solution of acetate or nitrate of lead, with potassium iodide: the nitrate produces a more brilliant yellow color." However, due to the toxicity and instability of the compound it is no longer used as such. It may still be used in art for bronzing and in gold-like mosaic tiles.

Stability 
Common material characterization techniques such as electron microscopy can damage samples of lead (II) iodide. Thin films of lead (II) iodide are unstable in ambient air. Ambient air oxygen oxidizes iodide into elemental iodine:

2 PbI2 + O2 → 2 PbO + 2 I2↑

Toxicity 

Lead iodide is very toxic to human health.  Ingestion will cause many acute and chronic consequences characteristic of lead poisoning. Lead iodide has been found to be a carcinogen in animals suggesting the same may hold true in humans. Lead iodide is an inhalation hazard, appropriate respirator should be used when handling powders of lead iodide.

Structure 

Weak van der Waals interactions have been observed between lead–iodide layers. The most common stacking forms are 2H and 4H. The 4H polymorph is most common in samples grown from the melt, by precipitation, or by sublimation, whereas the 2H polymorph is usually formed by sol-gel synthesis. The solid can also take an R6 rhombohedral structure.

See also

 Lead(II) bromide
 Lead(II) chloride
 Tin(II) iodide
 Bridgman–Stockbarger technique
 Perovskite solar cell

References

Cited sources

External links

 Toxic Substances Portal – Lead

Iodides
Lead(II) compounds
Metal halides
Semiconductor materials